Claf Abercuawg (IPA /klav ˌaber'ki:aug/, 'the leper of Abercuawg') is the modern title of a 32-stanza medieval Welsh englyn-poem. According to Jenny Rowland, 'most critics would classify it among the most sophisticated and moving all the early englynion poems'; it is 'the classic example' of meditative, lyric, at least implicitly religious, early Welsh poetry.

Content and style
The poem gradually reveals itself as a monologue by a person who is ill, probably with leprosy, as he laments his exile from society and the ruin of his homestead. It is characterised by the use of the natural world as a frame and reference point for human emotion, shifts of focus from the speaker's observations on his particular situation and gnomic observations on life in general, and jumps from one subject to another producing tantalising juxtapositions. The poem has frequently been compared (and contrasted) with the roughly contemporaneous Old English poems The Wanderer and The Seafarer.

Manuscripts and dating
The poem is attested principally in the late fourteenth-century Red Book of Hergest (p. 514, column 1034 line 24–column 1035 end). It was also included in the White Book of Rhydderch, but is now lost due to damage to the manuscript. However, it is attested in two later manuscripts descended from the White Book, Peniarth 111 (made by John Jones of Gellillyfdy in 1607), whose spelling is very close to the White Book's, and London, British Library, Add. MS 31055 (made by Thomas Wiliems in 1596), which is a less conservative copy. National Library of Wales 4973 section b contains the poem. Its relationship to the other manuscripts is complex and may represent a conflation of multiple medieval sources, but it seems to have at least some independent value as a witness to the lost archetype of the poem. It is fairly clear that all these manuscripts descend from a lost common original, to which they are all fairly similar, making the creation of a critical edition of the poems relatively straightforward. In all the independent witnesses, Claf Abercuawg precedes the cycle of englyn-poems known as Canu Llywarch Hen; indeed, in the White Book, Claf Abercuawg is entitled 'Englynion Mabclaf ap Llywarch' (‘englynion of Mabclaf son of Llywarch’). However, modern scholars do not see it as linked to the Llywarch Hen material.

Despite surviving first in fourteenth-century manuscripts and in largely Middle Welsh orthography, the poem is thought to have been composed in Old Welsh and transmitted orally and/or in manuscript, due to its archaic style and occasionally archaic spelling. Jenny Rowland judges that it dates from between the mid and late ninth century.

Influence
The poem was translated into English by the poet Edward Thomas in his influential book Beautiful Wales (1905). It was also influential on R. S. Thomas, who gave a lecture entitled Abercuawg in 1977, referring several times to Claf Abercuawg.

Text and translation
As edited by Ifor Williams and translated by Jenny Rowland, the poem runs:

Note: In the MS, the stanzas appear in the order shown here (in the Welsh). However, it is largely agreed, for stylistic reasons, that their order should be reversed, meaning that 31 ends the poem. This is what has been done in the supplied translation; the English parallel to 31 therefore actually corresponds to the Welsh in 32 and vice versa.

Editions and translations
 Ifor Williams (ed.), Canu Llywarch Hen gyda Rhagmadrodd a Nodiadau (Cardiff: Gwasg Prifysgol Cymru, 1935), pp. 23-27 [2nd edn 1953].
 Jenny Rowland, Early Welsh Saga Poetry: A Study and Edition of the 'Englynion’ (Cambridge: Brewer, 1990) (includes edition pp. 448–52 and translation pp. 497–99)
 Facsimile of National Library of Wales MS 4973B
 Wikisource

References

Welsh-language poems